Algernon Foster Vandeventer (1862 – November 5, 1931) was an American politician. He was a member of the Arkansas House of Representatives, serving from 1897 to 1901. He was a member of the Democratic party.

References

1931 deaths
Speakers of the Arkansas House of Representatives
Democratic Party members of the Arkansas House of Representatives
1862 births
People from Fulton County, Illinois
People from Conway County, Arkansas
19th-century American politicians
20th-century American politicians